Vertigo ronnebyensis is a species of minute air-breathing land snail, a terrestrial pulmonate gastropod mollusk in the family Vertiginidae, the whorl snails.

Shell description 
The shell is deeply perforate, long-ovate, regularly finely striate, very glossy and reddish-brown in color. The shell has 5½ convex whorls. The last whorl is about equal to the penult, which is a third higher than the preceding whorl, which is double the height of the next earlier. Last whorl has a transverse callus of the same color near the aperture. Suture is very oblique, ascending to the aperture.

Aperture is quite obliquely piriform, excised by the very oblique parietal wall. Aperture has 4 teeth: 1 parietal lamella, 1 conic tooth at the lower end of the sharply emerging, dark-colored columella; 2 short, widely separated, deeply immersed palatal folds. Margins are delicately united, the outer margin is weakly arcuate, nearly straight, the columellar margin is broadly reflected.

The width of the adult shell is 1.15-1.35 mm, the height is 2.0-2.35 mm.

Distribution
This species occurs in:
 Fennoscandia: Sweden, Norway, Denmark, and Finland
 Baltic states: Estonia, Latvia, and Lithuania
 Northwestern Russia: Kaliningrad
 Central Europe: Germany, Czech Republic, Poland

Habitat 
This species lives in forests, often in association with Vaccinium and preferably on acidic soils.

References
This article incorporates public domain text from reference.

 Bank, R. A.; Neubert, E. (2017). Checklist of the land and freshwater Gastropoda of Europe. Last update: July 16th, 2017

External links
 Westerlund, C. A. (1871). Exposé critique des mollusques de terre et d'eau douce de la Suède et de la Norvége. Nova Acta Societatis Regiae Scientiarum Upsaliensis. series 3, 8, 1 (1): 1–200. Uppsala (BERLING)

ronnebyensis
Molluscs of Europe
Gastropods described in 1871